Gili Motang is a small island in Eastern Indonesia.  It is part of the Lesser Sunda Islands chain, which together with the Greater Sunda Islands to the west make up the Sunda Islands.

The island, volcanic in origin, is approximately 30 km² (12 mi²) in area.

Home to a small population of about 100 Komodo dragons, Gili Motang is part of Komodo National Park.  In 1991 as part of the national park, Gili Motang was accepted as a UNESCO World Heritage Site.

Notes

Landforms of West Nusa Tenggara
Komodo National Park
Lesser Sunda Islands